"How I Could Just Kill a Man" is the debut single by hip hop group Cypress Hill from their eponymous debut album, Cypress Hill, and was their first major hit in 1991. It was released as a double A-side to "The Phuncky Feel One" and the music video featured cameos by A Tribe Called Quest's Q-Tip and Tim Dog, as well as Ice Cube, with whom the group would later feud. The song was also in the movie Juice (1992). It was re-released in 1999 with Spanish lyrics and a new video. It is featured as the first track on their greatest hits compilation Greatest Hits from the Bong. It was voted number 79 in About.com's Top 100 Rap Songs.

Towards the end of the song (approximately the 3:48 point) someone is heard saying, "All I wanted was a Pepsi". This quote is taken from the well-known Suicidal Tendencies song, "Institutionalized".

In 2001, Cypress Hill included a sequel to the song on their album Stoned Raiders entitled "Here Is Something You Can't Understand", using the same chorus but with new verses from B-Real, Sen Dog and guest Kurupt.

Track listing

 NOTE: "The Killer Mix" is the uncensored album version of the song.

Chart positions

Covers

Rage Against the Machine version

The song was covered by American rock band Rage Against the Machine on their cover album, Renegades, where the song was released as a single. Rage Against the Machine performed the song  on their DVD, Live at the Grand Olympic Auditorium, accompanied by Cypress Hill.

Track listing
 "How I Could Just Kill a Man" – 4:04

Chart positions

Certifications

Other versions
Singer Charlotte Sometimes named the first single from her debut album Waves and the Both of Us "How I Can Just Kill a Man" in honor of Cypress Hill, though the songs have no other similarities. The song quickly became a staple on both VH1 and MTV during the summer of 2008 and closed her set on the Vans Warped Tour.

It is also covered by B-star on their album What We Do.

A cover version was released in 1994 by German Hamburger Schule band Cpt. Kirk &. on the album Round About Wyatt, but with the song's title changed to "How He Could Just Kill a Man".

The song appears in the 2004 video game Grand Theft Auto: San Andreas in the radio station Radio Los Santos.

References

1991 debut singles
Cypress Hill songs
Rage Against the Machine songs
1991 songs
Columbia Records singles
Song recordings produced by DJ Muggs
Song recordings produced by Rick Rubin
Song recordings produced by Brendan O'Brien (record producer)
Epic Records singles
Hardcore hip hop songs
Songs written by DJ Muggs
Songs written by B-Real
Songs written by Sen Dog